Baldersby railway station was a railway station serving the village of Baldersby in North Yorkshire, England. It was located on a line from Melmerby, north of Ripon, to Thirsk on the East Coast Main Line.

History
Opened by the Leeds and Thirsk Railway, it became part of the London and North Eastern Railway during the Grouping of 1923. The line then passed on to the Eastern Region of British Railways on nationalisation in 1948. It was then closed by the British Transport Commission

The site today

The old trackbed peters out in a field and nothing remains of the station.

References

 
 
 
 Station on navigable O.S. map

External links
 Railscot on the Leeds and Thirsk Railway

Disused railway stations in North Yorkshire
Railway stations in Great Britain opened in 1848
Railway stations in Great Britain closed in 1959
Former North Eastern Railway (UK) stations